The Association of Small Bombs is a 2016 novel by Indian-American author and novelist Karan Mahajan. The novel is Mahajan's second, after 2012's Family Planning, and was first published in 2016 by Viking Press. The novel was named a finalist for the 2016 National Book Award for Fiction. It was met with positive reviews.

The novel opens with a bombing in a New Delhi marketplace in 1996 and explores the resultant trauma caused by the attack, examining it from the perspective of both the victims, their families, and the perpetrators.

Plot
The novel opens with the detonation of a bomb by a Kashmiri man, Shockie. The bomb kills thirteen and injures a further thirty, and the remainder of the novel alternates between the perspective of Shockie, those who were injured, and those who lost family in the explosion.

References

2016 American novels
Viking Press books